Thomas Mitchell Peirce (born April 5, 1864) was an American artist.

The son of Peter Randolph Livingston Peirce and Cordella Mitchell, he was educated at Bates Preparatory School, San Francisco before studying art in New York City and Paris. In 1897 he married Harriet May Neal. Neal was niece of L. Frank Baum.

Books illustrated
Richard Harding Davis, In the fog, 1901
Harold MacGrath, The Grey Cloak, 1903
Theodora Agnes Peck, Hester of the Grants: a romance of old Bennington, 1905
L. Frank Baum, Daughters of destiny, 1906
Sir Walter Scott, Ivanhoe, 1903

References

Mantle Fielding, Dictionary of American painters, sculptors & engravers

External links
 
 
 

1864 births
1929 deaths
American illustrators